The Andirá River is a river of Amazonas, Brazil. It is a tributary of the Juruá River.

The river forms the western boundary of the Tefé National Forest, created in 1989.
It forms the southwest boundary of the  Baixo Juruá Extractive Reserve, created in 2001.

See also
List of rivers of Amazonas (Brazilian state)

References

Rivers of Amazonas (Brazilian state)